The Gao Region (Bambara: ߜߊߏ ߘߌߣߋߖߊ tr. Gao Dineja) is a region in northeastern Mali. The capital city is Gao.

Geography
The region is bordered to the north by Kidal Region, to the west by Tombouctou Region and Taoudénit Region, to the east by the Ménaka Region, and most of the south by Niger (Tahoua Region and Tillabéri Region), sharing a portion of the southern border with Burkina Faso (Sahel Region).

Demographics
Common ethnicities in the Gao Region include the Songhai, Bozo, Tuareg, Bambara, and Kounta. The towns include Gao, Bourem, and Bamba.

The Gao Region is part of Mali, the northern part that was separated and declared independent by the National Movement for the Liberation of Azawad (MNLA) during the Tuareg rebellion of 2012. After the 1st Battle of Gao, the MNLA lost control to Islamist militias. Several other battles took place during the war, particularly in Gao.

Administrative subdivisions
For administrative purposes, the Gao Region is divided into three cercles:

History
Gao Region formerly comprised the entire eastern portion of the country, east of Tombouctou Region. In 1991 the northern half of Gao Region became Kidal Region.

See also
 Cercles of Mali
 Regions of Mali

References

External links

 .

 
Regions of Mali
Azawad